Huntington Hospital is a 544-bed, not-for-profit hospital in Pasadena, California.  The official name of the hospital is Pasadena Hospital DBA (doing business as) Huntington Hospital, known locally as HMH, Huntington Health, Huntington Memorial Hospital or Huntington Hospital.

In the 1930s Pasadena Hospital was awarded two million dollars from the estate of Henry Edwards Huntington, a Southern California businessman and booster, and as a result, the common name of the hospital was changed.

Only six years younger than Pasadena itself, Huntington Hospital has grown with the community they serve.

Their 24/7 specialist coverage ensures a hospital-based physician (hospitalist) is always available at the hospital for patients who need general, obstetrical or critical care. And as a leader in nursing care, they are one of only 10% of hospitals nationwide to have achieved Magnet designation, the gold standard in nursing.

Huntington is home to the largest emergency department and only level-II trauma center in the San Gabriel Valley – providing access to lifesaving emergency and trauma care 24/7. Their Family Birth Center and level-III neonatal intensive care unit (NICU) give babies the safest start to life.

Leading cancer care, cardiology services, orthopedic care and advanced robotic surgery — among many other health care services — are available.

Overview
Huntington Hospital is a non-profit, community-based medical center, which provides acute medical care and community services to the western San Gabriel Valley and nearby communities. In 2021, Huntington Hospital provided approximately $135 million in qualified community benefits, directed at vulnerable populations, education and training and charity care.  

First established in 1983, the Huntington Hospital Center for Trauma Care is the only level II trauma center serving the San Gabriel Valley, and one of 13 trauma centers in Los Angeles County.  Designated a Level II trauma center, the hospital provides trauma care and medevac capability 24/7 via its rooftop helipad. Huntington offers the only Regional Level III Neonatal Intensive Care Unit in the San Gabriel Valley.

In the late 1980s, a new emergency department, along with a new maternity department were built and opened in 1991. Then, a new inpatient tower, known as the east tower opened in the late 1990s and the inpatient west tower was built and opened in 2008. A larger emergency department was opened in 2014. It was part of the hospital's campaign fund made possible by residents of the greater Pasadena area to build these new buildings to meet the earthquake safety requirements.

In 2020, the hospital signed an agreement to join the Cedars-Sinai Health System.

Huntington Hospital is a teaching hospital that provides the best of both academic and community medicine. Huntington general surgery and internal medicine residents work in a beautiful, state-of-the-art hospital, and are taught by faculty who also hold appointments at the University of Southern California Keck School of Medicine.

Accreditation
Fully accredited by the Joint Commission, Huntington Hospital has advanced certification as a Comprehensive Stroke Center and participates in the American College of Surgeons National Surgical Quality Improvement Program.  It has received Blue Distinction in cardiac care, hip and knee replacement surgery and is considered a Center of Excellence by the American Society for Metabolic & Bariatric Surgery.  The Huntington Hospital Cancer Center has received the Outstanding Achievement Award from the American College of Surgeons Commission on Cancer.

Area covered for the paramedics
Huntington Hospital has area covered for the Paramedics:
 Los Angeles Fire Department – RA 35,
 Los Angeles County Fire Department – Squads 11 and 19
 Pasadena F.D. – RA 31, 32, 33, 34, and 36.
 South Pasadena F.D.

References

External links

 Huntington Hospital Website
 This hospital in the CA Healthcare Atlas A project by OSHPD

Hospitals in Los Angeles County, California
Buildings and structures in Pasadena, California
Keck School of Medicine of USC
Hospitals established in 1892
Hospital buildings completed in 1893
1893 establishments in California
Organizations based in Pasadena, California
Trauma centers